Love with the Proper Stranger is the debut album by the American rock band the Aquanettas, released in 1990. A video was produced for the album's lead single, "Diplomat".

Production
All four band members contributed to the songwriting; they also worked with outside writers. Nettwerk Records intentionally distorted the band photo on the album's cover, so that the group would not be perceived as merely a "girl group".

Critical reception

Trouser Press wrote: "Without pushing it as a gimmicky signature, singer/guitarist Deborah Schwartz’s mighty voice is redolent of West Coast ’60s folkrockers like the Mamas and the Papas (and, therefore, the early Bangles as well); drummer Stephanie Seymour’s high harmonies enhance and elevate the effect, as do the acoustic strummings and Jill Richmond’s tradition-packed lead guitar interjections." The Washington Post thought that the Aquanettas "aren't significantly retooling garage-rock, but they are keeping the engine warm," writing that the "melodic and vigorous ... tunes are vaguely Go-Go-ish, but more rakish." The New York Times deemed the music "classic, basic rock-and-roll: just rugged guitar riffs and lyrics about the more bothersome aspects of romance." 

The Los Angeles Daily News called the album "a celebration of acid- etched melody, reverberant guitars and monotone vocals," writing that the music "suggests the Bangles on hallucinogens." USA Today lamented that the Aquanettas "weren't produced very well." The New Haven Register deemed Love with the Proper Stranger "one of 1990's overlooked gems."

Track listing

Personnel
Jill Richmond - guitar
Deborah Schwartz - guitar, vocals
Stephanie Seymour - drums
Claudine Troise - bass

References

1990 albums
Nettwerk Records albums
I.R.S. Records albums